Husnabad is a town in the Siddipet district of the Indian state of Telangana. It was a part of Karimnagar district before re-organisation of districts in the state. It is located in Husnabad mandal.

Geography 
It is a mandal headquarters of Husnabad mandal in Siddipet district. Husnabad is situated partly on line of hills which passes through the town from South-west to North-east. Yellama Cheruvu is on the south side of the town.

History 
The town of Husnabad was part of Karimnagar district in the state of Hyderabad state from 1948 to 1956. Then it became part of Andhra Pradesh state till 2014 and later on June 2, 2014 It became part of newly formed state of Telangana. In 2016 the mandal of Husnabad along with Bejjanki and Koheda from Karimnagar district merged into newly formed Siddipet district. Husnabad was made as a revenue division in 2016 during the formation of new districts in Telangana.

Transport 
Husnabad is connected with roads on four sides with major cities like Warangal  to the east, Karimnagar  to the north, Siddipet  to the west and Jangaon  to the south. TSRTC operates buses to Karimnagar, Hyderabad, Nizamabad, Warangal, Godavarikhani, Siddipet and surrounding villages and mandals.

References 

Cities and towns in Siddipet district